Shahiruddin bin Ab Moin is a Malaysian politician and served as Pahang State Executive Councillor.

Election Results

References

United Malays National Organisation politicians
Members of the Pahang State Legislative Assembly
Pahang state executive councillors
21st-century Malaysian politicians
Living people
Year of birth missing (living people)
People from Pahang
Malaysian people of Malay descent
Malaysian Muslims